Dawn Stern (born October 15, 1971) is an American film and television actress; she is also a model.

Early life and education
She was raised in O'Fallon, Illinois, where she attended EK and O'Fallon Township High School. Stern graduated from Southern Illinois University at Edwardsville with a BS in Theatre Performance and Broadcast Communications (TV/Radio).

Career
Stern earned her AEA card with the St Louis Repertory Company and moved to Chicago where she worked as a model with Elite Chicago. She was named one of nine finalists in Revlon's Most Unforgettable Women contest in 1991. In 1992–1993, competing as a spokesmodel, Stern won 10 shows and the semifinal round in Ed McMahon's Star Search '93.  In 1996, she moved to Los Angeles, and within six months was appearing as Angela Collins on 413 Hope St., a dramatic television series about an urban teen crisis center, on the Fox network; and Allie Farrow on Viper, a science-fiction television series on the UPN broadcast network.  From 2003 to 2004, Stern starred as Callista (Callie) Larkadia in Starhunter 2300, a Canadian science-fiction television series, and scored a recurring role as Vanessa Lerner on the soap opera The Young and the Restless. Most recently, Stern appeared as Cat Ingerslev in a 2012 episode of the HBO television series True Blood.

Dawn Stern built a seventeen year television acting career which includes six pilots, three series regular gigs, over 30 guest star appearances and two films: The Fugitive and Original Gangstas.  Currently, she is the COO of DE-CRUIT and co-chair of the IDEA Committee for Shakespeare Theatre Association.

Personal life
She is married to Stephan Wolfert, Actor/Writer/Director, founder of DE-CRUIT

References

External links
 

American female models
American film actresses
American television actresses
Living people
People from St. Clair County, Illinois
1966 births
21st-century American women